Michelle Tea (born Michelle Tomasik, 1971) is an American author, poet, and literary arts organizer whose autobiographical works explore queer culture, feminism, race, class, sex work, and other topics. She is originally from Chelsea, Massachusetts and was identified with the San Francisco, California literary and arts community for many years. She currently lives in Los Angeles. Her books, mostly memoirs, are known for their exposition of the queercore community.

Early life 
Tea grew up in Chelsea, Massachusetts in a working-class family. Her father was a Polish Jew and her mother was Irish and French Canadian. She felt different from other children, and she took comfort in music. In high school, Tea identified with the goth subculture and artists such as Siouxsie Sioux. She was also drawn to literary work, including The Outsiders by S.E. Hinton, the poetry of Sylvia Plath, and the beat movement.

When she was twenty years old, Tea read Angry Women from RE/Search Publications, which included interviews with radical female performers, writers, and thinkers. The book was highly influential. "That really made me see that there is a lineage [of female writers], and a path, and I could really put myself on that," she explained in an interview.

During her childhood, Tea's stepfather spied on her through a drilled hole in the wall of her bedroom. She struggled with this abuse, and she was in denial for many years. Tea began drinking alcohol as a teenager. When she was 19 years old, her stepfather admitted to the abuse, but Tea's mother chose to stay with him. It was at this time that Tea decided to move out of her home and relocate to the home of her girlfriend at the time in Boston.

During this period, Tea supported herself with two minimum wage jobs as a hair salon receptionist and deli shop employee. Her girlfriend, a sex worker, was earning significantly more money than she did. She decided to go into sex work as well. In the early 1990s, Tea broke up with her girlfriend and moved to San Francisco.

Spoken word and Sister Spit
In San Francisco, Tea immersed herself in the literary and spoken word scene. It was  "...very democratic. There were open mics every night. The poetry was self-taught – punk and hip-hop inspired street poetry. It was perfect for me. I felt I could be my whole self, which at that point was queer, feminist, punk and working-class.”

In 1994, Michelle Tea and Sini Anderson formed Sister Spit, a queer feminist collective. The group hosted weekly open mic nights in San Francisco, which attracted local and underground talent, as well as more established writers such as Mary Gaitskill, Eileen Myles, and Beth Lisick. In 1997, Sister Spit launched Ramblin’ Road Show, a spoken word tour that performed in bars, galleries, bookstores, community centers, and other venues in the United States and Canada. The tour was briefly revitalized in 2007 with Sister Spit: The Next Generation, which featured artists such as Ariel Schrag, Justin Vivian Bond, Blake Nelson, Nicole J. Georges, Cristy Road, Eileen Myles, and Beth Lisick.

In 1998, her first book, The Passionate Mistakes and Intricate Corruption of One Girl in America, was published by Semiotexte/Smart Art Press. The book provided short stories in memoir form, exploring topics such as Tea's childhood in Massachusetts, her teenage interest in the goth subculture, and sex work.

Valencia 
In 2000, the memoir Valencia was published. The book chronicled the life of Michelle, a young lesbian poet, in the Mission district of San Francisco. The plot primarily focused on the love life of the main character, as she dated multiple women over the course of a year. She explained in an interview, "The 'Michelle' in the book is definitely me, though if it makes a reader more comfortable to imagine it’s all a giant work of fiction, that’s fine too." The book launched Tea into local and literary fame, especially after winning the 2001 Lambda Literary Award for Lesbian Fiction.

Radar Productions 
Tea is known for her work as an organizer and advocate for local artists and writers. In 2003, Tea founded Radar Productions, a nonprofit organization that produces events to showcase the work of queer writers and artists. She served as the Creative Director for twelve years before stepping down in 2015, so that she could focus on other pursuits. Juliana Delgado Lopera, a creative writing instructor at San Francisco State University, took her place. In 2015, Radar created Drag Queen Story Hour in San Francisco. The event, at which drag queens read books to kids, now happens in several cities around the United States and in Tokyo, Japan.

Recent work 
Tea has toured with the Sex Workers' Art Show. She is also a contributor to The Believer magazine.

In 2012, Tea partnered with City Lights Publishers to form the Sister Spit imprint.

From 2012 to 2015, Tea wrote a column for XOJane, where she chronicled the difficulties she faced in trying to have a baby with her partner, Dashiell. Her articles documented the stress and difficulty that accompanied fertility treatments and artificial insemination, and additionally illuminated gaps that existed for queer couples in a system that was created with heterosexual couples in mind.

In 2016, she created Amethyst Editions, an imprint of Feminist Press.

Tea stepped outside her work as a writer to serve as the Executive Producer of Valencia: The Movie. Based on her novel of the same name, the experimental film was spearheaded with filmmaker Hilary Goldberg. Valencia was filmed by 20 different lesbian, queer and trans directors, each assigned a different chapter of her novel. The twenty one different 'Michelle' characters "vary in age, gender, size, ethnicity, style and era".

Her experiences trying to conceive and preparing for parenthood led her to start the website Mutha Magazine, an alternative mothering/parenting website that caters to those parents that do not identify with mainstream parenting media. Of the project she says "I think there are a lot of women who get pregnant and have babies but they're not part of this cultural traditional ideas of what it means to be a mom and they're not interested in the media that's already out there."

In 2018, Against Memoir was published by Feminist Press.

Academics
In February 2008, Tea was the 23rd Zale Writer-in-Residence at the H. Sophie Newcomb Memorial College Institute at Tulane University. She did not go to college and, in interviews, has discussed the assumption that she has studied.

Critical acclaim
In February 2019, Michelle won the PEN / Diamondstein-Spielvogel Award for Art of the Essay for her book Against Memoir: Complaints, Confessions, and Criticisms! (Feminist Press, May 2018).

While touring together in the year 2000, Tea and writer Clint Catalyst came up with the idea to solicit first-person narratives for their 2004 anthology, Pills, Thrills, Chills and Heartache. Described by Publishers Weekly as a "celebrat[ion of] the avant-garde," the book, which includes work by JT Leroy, Dennis Cooper, and Eileen Myles, reached #10 on the Los Angeles Times non-fiction paperback bestseller list in its first week of release. Moreover, the book was a 2004 Lambda Literary Awards finalist in the Anthologies/Fiction category. Her books have often been nominated in the competition, beginning with the 2001 Lesbian Fiction nomination and award for Valencia.

She was awarded the Jim Duggins Outstanding Mid-Career Novelists' Prize by the Saints and Sinners Literary Festival in 2008.

Personal life 
Michelle Tea was in a relationship with Katastrophe, a transgender hip-hop artist, for many years. They shared an apartment in the North Beach district of San Francisco. In 2013, Tea married Dashiell Lippman at the Swedish American Hall in San Francisco. In 2015, her son was born.

Published work
 The Passionate Mistakes and Intricate Corruption of One Girl in America (1998) 
 Valencia (2000) 
 The Chelsea Whistle (2002) 
 The Beautiful (2003) 
 Rent Girl (2004) 
 Rose of No Man's Land (2006) 
 Transforming Community (2007) 
 Coal to Diamonds: A Memoir (2013)  (with Beth Ditto)
 Mermaid in Chelsea Creek (2013) 
 How to Grow Up: A Memoir (2015) 
 Girl at the Bottom of the Sea (2015) 
 Black Wave (2016) ; And Other Stories, UK 
 Modern Tarot: Connecting with Your Higher Self Through the Wisdom of the Cards (2017) 
 Against Memoir: Complaints, Confessions & Criticisms (2018) ; And Other Stories, UK 
  Knocking Myself Up: A Memoir of My (In)Fertility (2022) 

Anthologies
 Pills, Thrills, Chills, and Heartache: Adventures in the First Person (ed. with Clint Catalyst) (2004) 
 Without a Net: The Female Experience of Growing Up Working Class (ed.) (2004) 
 Baby, Remember My Name: An Anthology of New Queer Girl's Writing (ed.) (2006) 
 Sister Spit: Writing, Rants and Reminiscence from the Road (ed.) (2012)

See also
 Lesbian poetry

References

External links

1971 births
Living people
21st-century American memoirists
American women poets
Lambda Literary Award for Lesbian Fiction winners
American lesbian writers
Writers from Chelsea, Massachusetts
Writers from the San Francisco Bay Area
American LGBT poets
LGBT people from Massachusetts
LGBT people from California
American women memoirists
Rona Jaffe Foundation Writers' Award winners
21st-century American poets
Lesbian memoirists
21st-century American women writers